The 1983 National League was the second tier of motorcycle speedway racing in the United Kingdom.

Summary
The winning team was Newcastle Diamonds.

After the tragedy of losing a rider the previous season Milton Keynes endured a second loss when their rider Craig Featherby was killed in a crash at Peterborough in a National League match on 16 September. Featherby hit a lamp standard after being thrown from the bike.

Final table

National League Knockout Cup
The 1983 National League Knockout Cup was the 16th edition of the Knockout Cup for tier two teams. Exeter Falcons were the winners of the competition.

First round

Second round

Quarter-finals

Semi-finals

Final
First leg

Second leg

Exeter were declared Knockout Cup Champions, winning on aggregate 96–95.

Final leading averages

Riders & final averages
Berwick

Steve McDermott 9.43
Bruce Cribb 8.30
Brian Collins 6.33
Paul Thorp 6.20
Rob Grant Sr 5.87
Mike Caroline 5.58
Phil Jeffrey 4.36
Robin Hampton 3.43

Boston

Steve Lomas 7.93
David Gagen 7.75
Billy Burton 6.40 
Phil Alderman 5.67
David Blackburn 5.21
Dennis Mallett 4.94
Peter Framingham 4.37
Pete Chapman 4.31
Guy Wilson 3.92
Michael Holding 2.83

Canterbury

Denzil Kent 8.20
Barney Kennett 7.56
Kelvin Mullarkey 7.43
Andy Hibbs 6.70
Jamie Luckhurst 6.27
Dave Mullett 5.66
Laurie Etheridge 5.54
Kevin Brice 5.47
Keith Pritchard 4.91

Crayford

Barry Thomas 9.69
Paul Bosley 7.88
Kevin Teager 7.56
Andy Galvin 6.72
Alan Sage 6.63
Alan Mogridge 6.59
Trevor Banks 6.46

Edinburgh

Dave Trownson 8.74
Mark Fiora 7.77
Brett Saunders 7.44
George Hunter 6.96
Chris Turner 6.90
Roger Lambert 6.10
Glyn Taylor 6.07
Sean Courtney 4.68
Chris Kelly 2.83
Scott Cook 2.35

Exeter

Keith Millard 8.73
Rob Maxfield 7.88
Rob Ashton 7.35
Alun Rossiter 7.12
Steve Bishop 7.03
Kevin Price 6.28
Bob Coles 5.74

Glasgow

Steve Lawson 10.00
Jimmy McMillan 9.85 
Kenny McKinna 9.00 
Andy Reid 8.23
Colin Caffrey 5.64
David Cassels 4.95
Jim Beaton 4.00
Martin McKinna 3.74
Geoff Powell 3.57
Miles Evans 3.40
David Walsh 2.88

Long Eaton

Dave Perks 8.14
Alan Molyneux 8.09
Paul Stead 7.86
Paul Evitts 5.64
John Frankland 5.21
Mark Stevenson 4.63
Nicky Allot 3.50
David Tyler 2.58
John Proctor 1.18

Middlesbrough

Steve Wilcock 9.48 
Mike Spink 8.66 
Geoff Pusey 6.72 
Brian Havelock 6.16
Rob Woffinden 5.92
Paul Price 5.48
Ashley Norton 4.77 
Peter Nightingale 2.98
Mark Crang 2.88

Mildenhall

Derek Harrison 9.22 
Richard Knight 8.98 
Robert Henry 7.00 
Carl Blackbird 6.42
Dave Jackson 4.78
Andy Warne 4.11
Ian Farnham 2.34
Rob Parish 1.80

Milton Keynes

Craig Featherby 8.66 
Keith White 8.56
Steve Payne 8.51
Charlie McKinna 7.84
Chris Pidcock 6.09
Paul Clarke 5.57
Dennis Mallett 5.02
Peter Framingham 5.00
Steve Mildoon 2.78
Rob Wall 2.37

Newcastle

Joe Owen 11.10
Rod Hunter 10.51 
Bobby Beaton 10.20
Alan Emerson 7.20
Martin Scarisbrick 5.74
Bernie Collier 3.60
Dave Wild 3.05
Lawrie Bloomfield 2.52
Paul McHale 2.47
Neal Barnsley 1.80
Greg DeKok 1.63

Oxford

Nigel Sparshott 8.06
Graham Drury 7.79
Ian Clark 7.28
Mike Wilding 7.13
Kevin Smart 6.35
Wayne Jackson 5.40
Nigel De'ath 5.36
Steve Crockett 4.71
Mark Summerfield 4.17
Mark Chessell 1.65

Peterborough

Ashley Pullen 8.74
Dave Allen 8.09
Mick Hines 7.22
Ian Barney 6.53
Andy Buck 6.44
Mike Spinks 5.37
Neil Cotton 4.89
Dale Watson 2.36

Rye House

Marvyn Cox 9.83
Bobby Garrad 9.28 
Steve Naylor 8.00
Peter Johns 7.03
Kerry Gray 5.73
Steve Bryenton 5.70
Andrew Silver 4.69
Kevin Bowen 4.60
Chris Chaplin 2.89
Terry Broadbank 2.87
John Barclay 1.27

Scunthorpe

Nigel Crabtree 9.10
Andy Fisher 7.59
Rob Hollingworth 7.15
Craig Pendlebury 6.91
Julian Parr 6.56
Derek Richardson 6.28
Ian Gibson 5.68
Kevin Armitage 5.29
Mark DeKok 4.00

Stoke

Tom Owen 8.98
Pete Smith 7.35
John Jackson 6.66
Ian Robertson 5.16
Gary O'Hare 4.91
Jim Burdfield 4.80
Steve Sant 3.95
Gary Johnson 3.00
Richie Owen 2.60

Weymouth

Martin Yeates 10.39
Steve Schofield 8.97
Simon Cross 8.35
Stan Bear 7.18
Rob Mather 5.83
Gordon Humphreys 4.40
Chris Martin 4.11
David Biles 2.87
Ian Humphreys 2.17

See also
List of United Kingdom Speedway League Champions
Knockout Cup (speedway)

References

Speedway British League Division Two / National League